Night Song is a 2016 Franco-Canadian drama film written and directed by Raphaël Nadjari. It stars Géraldine Pailhas, Luc Picard, Felicia Shulman and Eléonore Lagacé. It won the Tobias Spencer Award at the Haifa International Film Festival.

Cast 
 Géraldine Pailhas as Hannah Hermann
 Luc Picard as Daniel Dussault
 Felicia Shulman as Etha Salomons
 Éléonore Lagacé as Abigail Colin
 Paul Kunigis as Samuel Badaszcs
 Alexandre Sheasby as David Hermann-Dussault
 Marcel Sabourin as Jean-Paul Dussault
 Raymond Cloutier as Marlus
 Michèle Dascain as Madame Kessel
 Jean Cordier as Monsieur Ruben
 Dorothée Berryman as Liliane Levy
 Natalie Choquette as Natalie Colin / Hannah's voice

References

External links 
 

2016 films
2016 drama films
French drama films
Canadian drama films
Films directed by Raphael Nadjari
Films about music and musicians
French-language Canadian films
2010s Canadian films
2010s French films